Gildingwells is a village and civil parish in the Metropolitan Borough of Rotherham in South Yorkshire, England, on the border with Nottinghamshire. It has a population of 115, increasing to 226 at the 2011 Census but now including Letwell.

Situated on a rural crossroads, Gildingwells is little more than a collection of farms. Education and shopping needs are fulfilled by the nearby settlements of Dinnington and Woodsetts.

See also
Listed buildings in Gildingwells

References

External links

Villages in South Yorkshire
Geography of the Metropolitan Borough of Rotherham
Civil parishes in South Yorkshire